Parent page: Flora of Canada

This is a listing of the non-vascular plants of Canada, and includes the mosses, liverworts and hornworts.

IDD - incomplete distribution data

Anthocerotophyta (hornworts)

Anthocerotaceae

Notothyladaceae

Bryophyta (mosses)

Andreaeaceae

Andreaeobryaceae

Archidiaceae

Aulacomniaceae

Bartramiaceae

Bryaceae

Catoscopiaceae

Hypopterygiaceae

Meesiaceae

Mniaceae 

Lists of plants

Non-vascular plants
Bryophytes